Grandchamp is a former commune in the Yonne department in Bourgogne-Franche-Comté in north-central France. On 1 January 2016, it was merged into the new commune of Charny-Orée-de-Puisaye.

Geography
The village lies in the middle of the commune, on the left bank of the river Ouanne, which flows northwestward through the commune.

See also
Communes of the Yonne department

References

Former communes of Yonne